Dozón is a municipality in Galicia, Spain in the province of Pontevedra.

References

Municipalities in the Province of Pontevedra